Mir Yusif Mir Heydar oglu Mirbabayev (Мирјусиф Мирһејдәр оғлу Мирбабајев, born 27 October 1977), better known as Miri Yusif, is an Azerbaijani rapper, singer-songwriter. Miri Yusif first emerged as a hip hop artist, part of Dayirman, which released their debut album Qurd in 2001.

In 2010s, despite the commercial dominance of hip-hop during this period, he found success with his reggae and soul fusion album "Karma", peaked at number 1 in the Azerbaijani Albums Chart in 2010.

References

External links

1977 births
Living people
21st-century Azerbaijani male singers
Azerbaijani rappers
Azerbaijani singer-songwriters
Musicians from Baku